La rubia del camino (The Blonde on the Road) is a 1938 Argentine romantic comedy written and directed by Manuel Romero. Actress Paulina Singerman made her debut in the film.

Synopsis

A young millionairess and flirt (Paulina Singerman) is conquered by a truck driver (Fernando Borel) who gives her a ride when she is on the run from her commitment to an Italian count (Enrique Serrano). The film contrasts the spoiled protagonist who uses the foreign name "Betty" and has never tried mate, the drink of all Argentines, to the hard working, long-suffering poor.
The romance almost founders when the truck driver resists joining the cosmopolitan life of the Buenos Aires elite, but is saved when Betty agrees to join him in his more "authentic" world.

Cast
The cast was:
Paulina Singerman as Isabel 'Betty' Costa Reina
Enrique Serrano as Count Ugolino Malipieri
Marcelo Ruggero as Batista
Sabina Olmos as Lucía
Fernando Borel as Julián Achával
María Esther Buschiazzo as Elvira Costa Reina
Juan José Porta as Grandfather
Enrique Roldán as Raúl
Mary Dormal as Inés
Alberto Terrones as Emilio Costa Reina
María Vitaliani as Marietta

Reception
The critic "Calki" called the film an agile and well-made comedy and praised the performance of Paulina Singerman and Fernando Borel. He said it had good dialog that entertains and amuses without any pause in the action.
The critic Rodrigo Tarruell wrote that "the encounter of Paulina with the truck driver achieved an exalted mix of sexual passion and class struggle worthy of D. H. Lawrence."

References
Citations

Sources

1938 films
1930s Spanish-language films
Argentine black-and-white films
Films directed by Lucas Demare
1930s romantic comedy-drama films
Argentine romantic comedy-drama films
1938 comedy films
1938 drama films